This is a list of awards and prizes formerly awarded at the Angoulême International Comics Festival.

Longer-running awards
Prize for Scenario (1993-2006)
Media award (1981–2003)
Bloody Mary award / Critics' award (1984–2003)
Religious award (1985–2003)
Humour award (1989–2001)

Limited-run awards

Award for best French artist
 1974: Alexis
 1975: Jacques Tardi
 1976: André Cheret
 1977: Moebius
 1978: Paul Gillon

Award for best foreign artist
 1974: Victor de la Fuente
 1975: Dino Battaglia
 1976: Richard Corben
 1977: Wallace Wood
 1978: Derib

Award for best artist
This award was a continuation of the previous two.
 1979: Ceppi
 1980: François Bourgeon

Award for best French author
 1974: Christian Godard
 1975: Claire Bretécher
 1976: Pierre Christin
 1977: Jacques Lob
 1978: Gérard Lauzier

Award for best foreign author
 1974: Roy Thomas
 1975: Sidney Jordan
 1976: Raoul Cauvin
 1977: Willy Vandersteen
 1978: Sirius

Award for best author
This award was a continuation of the previous two.
 1979: Ted Benoît
 1980: Jean-Claude Forest

Award for best French publisher
 1974: Glénat
 1975: Futuropolis

Award for best foreign publisher
 1974: National Lampoon
 1975: Sugar

Award for the best promotion of comics
 1976: L'encyclopedie de la BD by Pierre Couperie, Henri Filippini and Claude Moliterni, Serg
 1977: Gérard Jourd'hui, a program on TF1
 1978: Le 9e rêve, by the students of the Institut Saint-Luc in Brussels
 (1979: no award in this category)
 1980: Découverte du monde  by Larousse

Grand Prix for the graphic arts
 1985: Giraud / Moebius
 1986: Albert Uderzo
 1987: André Franquin

Library readers award
 1985: Le moine fou by Vink
 1985 (joint winner): Tendre violette by Jean-Claude Servais
 1985 (joint winner): Grimion gant de cuir by Makyo
 1986: La voyageuse de la petite ceinture by Annie Goetzinger and Pierre Christin
 (1987-1998: no award in this category)
 1999: Ibicus part 1 by Rabaté, Vents d’Ouest

Libération award
 1987: Sambre: Plus ne m’est rien by Yslaire (artist) and Balac (author), Glénat

FM-BD award
 1985: Les passagers du vent: Le bois d’ébène by François Bourgeon, Glénat

Lucien award
 1986: La quête de l’oiseau du temps: Le Rige by Régis Loisel (artist) and Serge Le Tendre (author), Dargaud
 1987: Le nain jaune by Jean-Claude Denis (artist) and Luc Leroi (author), Casterman
 1988: Jacques Gallard: Zoulou blues by Tripp, Milan

School comic award
 1985: Luong Dien Phong, Laurent Pavesi and Pascal Masslo
 1986: Luc Jacomon from Epinal
 1987: Nicolas Marlet
 1988: Benoît Ers
 1989: La terre est une belle plage by Moana Thouard
 1990: Jochen Gerber
 1991: Benjamin Sabatier
 1992: Frédéric Rémuzat

Free Russia award
 1986: Tintin au pays des Soviets by Hergé, Casterman

National comic contest
 1992: Cédric Billotti (Cibi) and Vang Ye

Tournesol award
The Tournesol award, named after the French name of Professor Calculus from the comic book series The Adventures of Tintin, was awarded by the French Green party for the comic that showed best the typical ideals of the party. Since 2004, the award is no longer part of the official program of the Angoulême festival.
 1997: Les otages de l’Ultralum (Hostages of the Ultralum), Pierre Christin and Jean-Claude Mézières, Dargaud
 1998: Ikar: La machine à arrêter la guerre by René Follet and Pierre Makyo, Glénat
 1999: Palestine by Joe Sacco, Vertige Graphic
 2000: Paroles de taulard by Corbeyron et al., Delcourt
 2001: Dans l’cochon tout est bon by Mazan, Delcourt
 2002: Rural! and two other works by Etienne Davodeau, Delcourt
 2003: Cambouis by Luz, L’Association

Graphical invention award
Also called: Award of the school of the image.
 2001: Le canard qui aimait les poules by Carlos Nine, Albin Michel

Award for best dialogue
 2002: Terrain Vague by Kaz, Cornelius
 Agrippine by Claire Bretécher, Bretécher
 Georges et Louis: La reine des mouches by O. Goossens, Fluide Glacial
 Grand Vampire: Cupidon s’en fout by Joann Sfar, Delcourt
 Promenade(s) by Pierre Wazem, Atrabile
 Le Roi Catastrophe: Adalbert ne manque pas d’air by Lewis Trondheim and Parme, Delcourt
 Le Singe et la Sirène by Dumontheuil and Angeli, Casterman
 2003: Quelques mois à l’Amélie by Jean-Claude Denis, Dupuis
 De capes et de crocs by Ayroles and Masbou
 Lincoln: Grain de sable by Jouvray
 Les Losers sont des perdants by Pichelin and Herse
 La nurse aux mains sanglantes by Benoît Sokal
 Powers by Brian Michael Bendis and Michael Avon Oeming

Polish award
Awarded by bilingual Polish comic readers.
 2002: Pilules bleues by Frederik Peeters, Atrabile
 2003: Le Chat du Rabbin by Joann Sfar, Dargaud

Worldview Award ("Prix regards sur le monde") 
Awarded to a nonfiction or autobiographical comic.
 2010: Rébétiko by David Prudhomme, Futuropolis
 2011: Gaza 1956. En marge de l'histoire by Joe Sacco, Futuropolis
 2012: Une Vie dans les marges by Yoshihiro Tatsumi, Editions Cornelius

References

Former Prizes
Comics awards
Angoulême International Comics Festival